Sandrea Ng Shy Ching is a Malaysian politician who has served as Member of the Perak State Executive Council (EXCO) in the Barisan Nasional (BN) state administration under Menteri Besar Saarani Mohamad since November 2022 and Member of the Perak State Legislative Assembly (MLA) for Teja since May 2018. She is a member of the People's Justice Party (PKR), a component party of the Pakatan Harapan (PH) coalition. She is the Deputy Communication Director, Women Deputy Chief and Women Treasurer of PKR of Perak.

Notes

Election results

External links

References 

People's Justice Party (Malaysia) politicians
Members of the Perak State Legislative Assembly
Malaysian people of Chinese descent
Malaysian politicians of Chinese descent
Living people
Year of birth missing (living people)